This is a list of prostitution-by-area articles

A

 Prostitution in Afghanistan
 Prostitution in Africa
 Prostitution in Albania
 Prostitution in Algeria
 Prostitution in American Samoa
 Prostitution in the Americas
 Prostitution in ancient Greece
 Prostitution in ancient Rome
 Prostitution in Angola
 Prostitution in Antigua and Barbuda
 Prostitution in Argentina
 Prostitution in Armenia
 Prostitution in Asia
 Prostitution in Australia
 Prostitution in Austria
 Prostitution in Azerbaijan

B

 Prostitution in the Bahamas
 Prostitution in Bahrain
 Prostitution in Bangladesh
 Prostitution in Barbados
 Prostitution in Belarus
 Prostitution in Belgium
 Prostitution in Belize
 Prostitution in Benin
 Prostitution in Bhutan
 Prostitution in Bolivia
 Prostitution in Botswana
 Prostitution in Brazil
 Prostitution in the British Overseas Territories
 Prostitution in Brunei
 Prostitution in Bulgaria
 Prostitution in Burkina Faso
 Prostitution in Burundi

C

 Prostitution in California
 Prostitution in Cambodia
 Prostitution in Cameroon
 Prostitution in Canada
 History of prostitution in Canada
 Prostitution in Cape Verde
 Prostitution in the Central African Republic
 Prostitution in Chad
 Prostitution in Chile
 Prostitution in China
 Prostitution in Hong Kong
 Prostitution in Macau
 Prostitution in Taiwan
 Prostitution in Tibet
 Prostitution in Colombia
 Prostitution in colonial India
 Prostitution in the Democratic Republic of the Congo
 Prostitution in Costa Rica
 Prostitution in Croatia
 Prostitution in the Crown dependencies
 Prostitution in Cuba
 Prostitution in Cyprus
 Prostitution in the Czech Republic

D

 Prostitution in Denmark
 Prostitution in the Democratic Republic of the Congo
 Prostitution in Djibouti
 Prostitution in the Dominican Republic
 Prostitution in the Dutch Caribbean

E

 Prostitution in East Timor
 Prostitution in Ecuador
 Prostitution in Egypt
 Prostitution in El Salvador
 Prostitution in Eritrea
 Prostitution in Estonia
 Prostitution in Ethiopia
 Prostitution in Eswatini
 Prostitution in Europe

F

 Prostitution in Fiji
 Prostitution in Finland
 Prostitution in France
 Prostitution in Overseas France
 Prostitution in Paris

G

 Prostitution in the Gambia
 Prostitution in Georgia (country)
 Prostitution in Germany
 Prostitution in the German Democratic Republic
 Prostitution in Ghana
 Prostitution in Greece
 Prostitution in ancient Greece
 Prostitution in Guam
 Prostitution in Guatemala
 Prostitution in Guinea-Bissau
 Prostitution in Guyana

H

 Prostitution in Haiti
 Prostitution in Harlem Renaissance
 Prostitution in Hawaii
 Prostitution in Honduras
 Prostitution in Hong Kong
 Prostitution in Hungary

I

 Prostitution in Iceland
 Prostitution in India
 Prostitution in colonial India
 Prostitution in Kolkata
 Prostitution in Mumbai
 Prostitution in Indonesia
 Prostitution in Iran
 Prostitution in Iraq
 Prostitution in the Republic of Ireland
 Prostitution in Israel
 Prostitution in Ivory Coast
 Prostitution in Italy
 Prostitution in ancient Rome

J

 Prostitution in Jamaica
 Prostitution in Japan
 Prostitution in Jordan

K

 Prostitution in Kazakhstan
 Prostitution in Kenya
 Prostitution in Kolkata
 Prostitution in North Korea
 Prostitution in South Korea
 Prostitution in Kosovo

L

 Prostitution in Laos
 Prostitution in Latvia
 Prostitution in Lebanon
 Prostitution in Libya
 Prostitution in Lithuania
 Prostitution in Luxembourg

M

 Prostitution in Macau
 Prostitution in the Republic of Macedonia
 Prostitution in Madagascar
 Prostitution in Malawi
 Prostitution in Malaysia
 Prostitution in the Maldives
 Prostitution in Mali
 Prostitution in Malta
 Prostitution in Mexico
 Prostitution in Moldova
 Prostitution in Monaco
 Prostitution in Mongolia
 Prostitution in Morocco
 Prostitution in Mozambique
 Prostitution in Mumbai
 Prostitution in Myanmar

N

 Prostitution in Namibia
 Prostitution in Nepal
 Prostitution in Nevada
 Prostitution in the Netherlands
 Prostitution in the Dutch Caribbean
 Prostitution in New Zealand
 Prostitution in Nicaragua
 Prostitution in Niger
 Prostitution in Nigeria
 Prostitution in North Korea
 Prostitution in Northern Ireland
 Prostitution in Norway

O

 Prostitution in Oceania
 Prostitution in Oman
 Prostitution in Overseas France

P

 Prostitution in Pakistan
 Prostitution in the State of Palestine
 Prostitution in Panama
 Prostitution in Papua New Guinea
 Prostitution in Paraguay
 Prostitution in Paris
 Prostitution in Peru
 Prostitution in the Philippines
 Prostitution in Poland 
 Prostitution in Portugal

Q

 Prostitution in Qatar

R

 Prostitution in the Republic of Ireland
 Prostitution in the Republic of Macedonia
 Prostitution in Rhode Island
 Prostitution in Romania 
 Prostitution in Russia
 Prostitution in the Soviet Union
 Prostitution in Rwanda

S

 Prostitution in Samoa
 Prostitution in Saudi Arabia
 Prostitution in Scotland
 Prostitution in Senegal
 Prostitution in Sierra Leone
 Prostitution in Singapore
 Prostitution in the Solomon Islands
 Prostitution in Somalia
 Prostitution in South Africa
 Prostitution in South Korea
 Prostitution in South Sudan
 Prostitution in the Soviet Union
 Prostitution in Spain 
 Prostitution in Francoist Spain
 Prostitution in the Spanish Civil War
 Prostitution in Sri Lanka
 Prostitution in the State of Palestine
 Prostitution in Suriname
 Prostitution in Sweden 
 Prostitution in Switzerland
 Prostitution in Syria

T

 Prostitution in Taiwan
 Prostitution in Tajikistan
 Prostitution in Tanzania
 Prostitution in Thailand
 Child prostitution in Thailand
 Prostitution in Tibet
 Prostitution in Togo
 Prostitution in Trinidad and Tobago
 Prostitution in Tunisia
 Prostitution in Turkey
 Prostitution in Turkmenistan

U

 Prostitution in Uganda
 Prostitution in Ukraine 
 Prostitution in the United Arab Emirates
 Prostitution in the United Kingdom 
 Prostitution in the British Overseas Territories
 Prostitution in the Crown dependencies
 Prostitution in Northern Ireland
 Prostitution in Scotland
 Prostitution in the United States
 Prostitution in California
 Prostitution in Harlem Renaissance
 Prostitution in Hawaii
 Prostitution in Nevada
 Prostitution in Rhode Island
 Prostitution in Uruguay
 Prostitution in Uzbekistan

V

 Prostitution in Venezuela
 Prostitution in Vietnam

Y

 Prostitution in Yemen

Z

 Prostitution in Zambia
 Prostitution in Zimbabwe

Sexuality-related lists